Solent University (formerly Southampton Solent University) is a public university based in Southampton, United Kingdom. It has approximately 10,500 students (2019/20). Its main campus is located on East Park Terrace near the city centre and the maritime hub of Southampton.

Solent University students are represented by Solent Students' Union, which is based on the East Park Terrace campus.

History
The university's origins can be traced back to a private School of Art founded in 1856, which eventually became the Southampton College of Art. Mergers with the Southampton College of Technology, and later the College of Nautical Studies at Warsash, led to the establishment of the Southampton Institute of Higher Education in 1984.

Southampton Institute became a university on 12 July 2005, adopting the name Southampton Solent University on 15 August that year. Prior to this, Southampton Institute provided assistance to Nottingham Trent University in its provision of business-focused degrees, relating to accountancy, finance and professional ACCA qualifications; some Nottingham Trent University certificates included Southampton Institute/Solent University stamps to indicate this agreement.

In 2005, Solent University was featured on an edition of BBC South's investigative programme Inside Out for rewarding grades for poor standards of work; independent experts questioned if those students were ready to study at the university if the courses were 'remedial'.

In 2015, Solent University came to an agreement with New College of the Humanities, London, whereby it would validate some of their degrees. In November 2017, the Privy Council approved the change of name of Southampton Solent University to Solent University, with effect from 2018.

Campus
Solent University has three primary locations: City, Warsash and Timsbury Lake. The City campus is in the centre of Southampton, on the east side of East Park. This campus broadly includes the Sir James Matthews building, which is situated on the far side of the park. Part of the Warsash School of Maritime Science and Engineering is on the eastern bank of the Hamble River overlooking Southampton Water, while Timsbury Lake is located in Timsbury.

Halls of residence
The university has five major student Halls complexes:
 Chantry
 Deanery
 Hamwic
 Kimber (incorporating the David Moxon Annexe)

All the halls are located a short walk away from the main teaching buildings. They are all located south east of the city centre, between the St Mary's and Ocean Village areas of Southampton.

Academic profile

Solent University is a comprehensive university offering programmes across five academic faculties, including the Faculty of Business, Law and Digital Technologies (which incorporates the Solent Business School and the Solent Law School), the Faculty of Creative Industries, Architecture and Engineering, the Faculty of Sport, Health and Social Science, and Warsash Maritime School.

Solent's maritime courses have been ranked among the best in the world. The university generally has a growing reputation, and have been climbing the major league tables year on year - most recently reaching 81st place in the Guardian League Table in 2019.

The university also has strong links with local and regional businesses, professional bodies and industry groups, all with a focus on providing the best routes into the workforce (for example the British Computer Society, Creative Skillset and the PTC).

The student yachting team have often consisted of Olympians and are previous world champions.

Research
The university also has a dedicated Research, Innovation and Enterprise Office, providing cohesive support for research and innovation through a researcher development programme and the Research, Innovation and Knowledge Exchange Awards.

Creative and digital industries
Solent has a strong record of research and innovation in the creative industries, with a focus on the fields of visual art and culture (history, theory and practice), music industries, screen research (film and television), and communications and creative writing.

Rapidly developing research areas in creative and immersive technologies, such as virtual reality and augmented reality, are driving innovative research forward. We cover the range of the design process from inception through prototyping, to implementation and user experience and usability.

Business and society
Working with private, public and third sector industries, Solent focuses on research areas such as marketing, the 'visitor economy', SME partnerships, international economic development, entrepreneurship and innovation, and cyber-crime. A particular focus is social policy in relation to employment, gender, and diversity in areas ranging from maritime and seafarers, to music and culture.

Sport, health and wellbeing
Solent University has emerged as a leading provider of academic programmes relating to the study of sport, health and wellbeing. These programmes are informed by cutting-edge research in areas such as sports science, sports development, the sociology of sport, psychology, health and wellbeing, and social care.

A focus of current research is how sport can be used as a vehicle for social change. Research in sports science focuses on strength and conditioning, the physiological basis of human performance in a range of sub-elite and elite sporting environments, and the psychology of the coaching process. The university is also recognised as one of the leading centres for football-based research.

Maritime, technology and environment
Historically, one of the key research strengths of Solent has been in maritime sector. Having run courses industry leading courses in yacht design and boat yard management since the 1970s and then by adding Warsash Maritime Academy with its long history and association with shipping, ports and seafarer training in the late 1990s this is now fully integrated as the Warsash School of Maritime Science and Engineering.

The focus is on applied research and innovation that affect industry, including a focus on maritime education and training (including the use of technology), employment, health and safety, gender, and welfare. They also have a developing area of research relating to sustainability and resilience, including environmental accounting, life-cycle assessment; environmental impacts, and modelling. Other areas of research include materials science and additive manufacturing; acoustics; computer networks, immersive technologies, multimedia communication, and software engineering; as well as sustainable design and the built environment. It also hosts the China Centre (Maritime).

Media Technology 
The Media Technology courses (such as the Broadcast Engineering, Live Sound and Acoustics courses) have now been merged into one 'Live Event Technology' course which covers all of these bases. This course is well regarded in the broadcast industry and frequently visits networking events hosted by SMPTE UK, among other opportunities (such as the Media Technology and Production Show and visits to BBC Elstree).

This course works closely with the Live Events Society and SonarTV as their technical skills are often required on their productions. They also work at some of the largest festivals in the UK, such as Glastonbury and Boardmasters.

Student life

Student Media
The TV, Live Events Society and Cinema outlets at Solent University are covered by the umbrella brand of 'Sonar Events'. These outlets are run entirely by students.

TV station
The student-run television station operated under the name SonarTV; it was founded in 2009 as part of the student media rebrand within the Students' Union. SonarTV are the only outlet within the university that can affiliate with NaSTA (The National Student Television Association), and in 2012 was selected to be the joint host for the first-ever NaSTAvision broadcast with Staffs TV of Staffordshire University. At the 2013 NaSTA Awards, they achieved third place for Best Broadcaster in the 40th annual edition of the NaSTA Awards, hosted by XTV of Exeter University. SonarTV is re-affiliating with NaSTA in 2022.

Radio station
The student-run Radio Station is called Radio Sonar. It was founded in 1998 and was originally known as Sin FM. The name came from the first 28-day FM radio licence held by the station. After applying for a Low Powered AM (LPAM) licence, the station changed its name to Sin Radio and at the same time became an online radio station; the name was changed to Radio Sonar in 2009. (The rename was in conjunction with all Student Union media, part of the Sonar Media rebrand.) Radio Sonar won the award for 'Outstanding Contribution to Student Radio' at the National Student Radio Conference in 2010 and again in 2011; in 2012, Mel Lewis won Best Female Presenter. Radio Sonar was nominated in the 2014 SRA awards for 'Best Chart Show' and achieved third place.

Sport
Solent University has a long tradition of achieving at sailing, and has won the student national yachting championships on numerous occasions.

Notable alumni

See also
 Armorial of UK universities
 List of universities in the United Kingdom

References

External links

 
Educational institutions established in 1984
1984 establishments in England
Tourist attractions in Southampton
Universities UK